Charlie Dobson is a British sprinter, who came second in the 200 metres event at the 2018 IAAF World U20 Championships. He was part of the British team that won the 4 x 400 m relay at the 2022 European Athletics Championships.

Personal life
Dobson is from Colchester, Essex, England. He studied at St Benedict's Catholic College and Colchester Sixth Form College. As of 2022, he is a student of aeronautical engineering at Loughborough University.

Career
Dobson competes for Colchester Harriers Athletics Club. He won his first international competition, which was the Loughborough International meeting. He came second in the 200 metres event at the 2018 IAAF World U20 Championships, finishing behind teammate Jona Efoloko. Dobson had set personal best times in the heat and semi-finals of the competition.

In 2020, Dobson set the British Universities & Colleges Sport record for the 60 metres event. In 2021, Dobson ran the 400 metres event once. His finishing time was the joint fastest by a Briton that year, tied with Matthew Hudson-Smith. He was selected in the British team for the 2021 World Athletics Relays, but injured himself prior to the event. The injury also prevented him from attempting to qualify for the delayed 2020 Summer Olympics; he had been hoping to make the British 4 x 400 metres team at the Games. He spent 10 months out with injury before returning in February 2022 at the Loughborough Indoor Open.

In April 2022, Dobson ran a 200 metres event in 20.19, the 11th fastest time by a Briton in history. Later in the year, he ran a wind-assisted 19.99 seconds to beat Nethaneel Mitchell-Blake. He was part of the British team that won the 4 x 400 m relay at the 2022 European Athletics Championships, alongside Matthew Hudson-Smith, Alex Haydock-Wilson and Lewis Davey. It was his first major relay. Dobson also finished fourth in the individual 200 metres event.

References

External links
 
 

Living people
Sportspeople from Colchester
English male sprinters
British male sprinters
Alumni of Loughborough University
20th-century English people
21st-century English people
European Athletics Championships winners
1999 births